Henry Cooper Cliffe (19 July 1862 – 1 May 1939) was a British stage and screen actor a member of a distinguished family of English actors, his father was Clifford Cooper, mother Agnes Kemble, and his brother was Frank Kemble Cooper. Frank's daughter Violet was a niece. His wife was Alice Belmore. He had an illustrious career on stage in classical roles. Late in life he began appearing in silent film during the World War I years.

Selected filmography
The Face in the Moonlight (1915)
The Final Judgment (1915)
Gold and the Woman (1916)
The Kiss of Hate (1916)
 Arms and the Woman (1916)
Extravagance (1916)
The Argyle Case (1917)
Raffles, the Amateur Cracksman (1917)
Half an Hour (1920)
 The Blue Pearl (1920)
The Devil's Garden (1920)
The Woman God Changed (1921)
Love's Redemption (1921)
His Children's Children (1923)
Monsieur Beaucaire (1924)

References

External links

portrait

1862 births
1939 deaths
20th-century English male actors
People from Oxford
English male stage actors
English male film actors
English male silent film actors
British emigrants to the United States
Kemble family
Male actors from Oxfordshire